WYCV (900 AM) is a radio station broadcasting a Gospel Music format. The station is licensed to Granite Falls, North Carolina, United States, and is currently owned by Freedom Broadcasting Corporation.

History
After playing country and western for almost 20 years, on June 10, 1983, WKJK changed its format to gospel music, with many positive comments.

On December 1, 1985, WKJK changed its call letters to WYCV.

References

External links

Gospel radio stations in the United States
YCV
Radio stations established in 1974